181st Division may refer to:

 181st Armed Police Mobile Division
 181st Rifle Division
 181st Infantry Division (Wehrmacht)

Military units and formations disambiguation pages